David A. Olsen (November 29, 1937 - November 14, 2009) was chairman of brokerage firm Johnson & Higgins from 1991 until its business combination with Marsh & McLennan in 1997.

Career
Olsen attended Bowdoin College, and subsequently joined brokerage firm Johnson & Higgins in 1966. He became its chief executive officer in 1990 and held that position until 1997, when the company merged with Marsh & McLennan. Additionally, he was chairman of the company from 1991 until 1997. He served as vice chairman of MMC from May through December 1997 and now serves on the board. Olsen also serves as a trustee emeritus of Bowdoin College, a director of Salisbury Visiting Nurses Association, and an advisory board member of the Salisbury Housing Trust and the Northwest Center for Family Services.

References

External links
 Forbes.com]

2009 deaths
20th-century American businesspeople
Bowdoin College alumni
1937 births